Musconetcong Mountain is a ridge in the Highlands region of New Jersey running south of and parallel to the Musconetcong River. The ridge travels through Alexandria, Holland, Bethlehem and Lebanon Township.

Prominent Features
Point Mountain, 935 feet, in Lebanon Township

Central Delaware Valley American Viticultural Area
The southern boundary of the Central Delaware Valley AVA, an American Viticultural Area, is near Titusville, New Jersey, and its northern border is near Musconetcong Mountain.

References

External links
Musconetcong Mountain Conservancy
Northern Musconetcong Mountain Region

Ridges of New Jersey
Landforms of Hunterdon County, New Jersey